Jason Napper is a former Canadian diver. He won a gold medal in the 1 metre springboard event and a bronze medal in the 10 metre platform event at the 1994 Commonwealth Games in Victoria, British Columbia.

References

Year of birth missing (living people)
Living people
Divers at the 1994 Commonwealth Games
Canadian male divers
Place of birth missing (living people)
Commonwealth Games medallists in diving
Commonwealth Games gold medallists for Canada
Commonwealth Games bronze medallists for Canada
20th-century Canadian people
Medallists at the 1994 Commonwealth Games